Factitious dermatitis, also known as dermatitis artefacta, is a form of factitious disorder in which patients will intentionally feign symptoms and produce signs of disease in an attempt to assume the patient role. It is also self-inflicted skin damage, most commonly from prolonged deliberate scratching, but sometimes by means of sharp instruments or another agency.

See also 
 List of cutaneous conditions

References

External links 

Neurocutaneous conditions